Temple B'nai Shalom (Sons or Children of Peace) is a synagogue in Brookhaven, Lincoln County, Mississippi (not to be confused with another historic and architecturally significant  Jewish temple of the same name on the National Register of Historic Places in Huntsville, Alabama).

History

The congregation formed in 1894.  A synagogue building was erected at Chickasaw and South Church Streets in 1896.  The congregation deconsecrated and donated the building to the Lincoln County Historical and Genealogical Society to be used as a county history museum in 2009.

Architecture

The white clapboard building is notable for its Moorish Revival Horseshoe arch windows, and for a truncated tower that "references the porthole of an Islamic minaret" with a slender Horseshoe arch window.

References

 

Buildings and structures in Lincoln County, Mississippi
Synagogues in Mississippi
Moorish Revival synagogues
Moorish Revival architecture in Mississippi
1894 establishments in Mississippi